Santa Ponsa (Catalan and officially: Santa Ponça) is a small town in the southwest of Mallorca. Located in the municipality of Calvià, it is 18 kilometres from the capital Palma.

History 
It was believed that Santa Ponsa derived from a Roman villa called Santa Ponctia, but derives from the Arabic words Sanat Busa which means area of rush bushes. Santa Ponsa is where King James I of Aragon (Jaume in Catalan) landed on September 12, 1229 in his successful quest to conquer the island and take it from the Moors after more than 300 years of Muslim rule. Majorca became part of the Crown of Aragon following James's conquest, and was later annexed to the Monarchy of Spain. A cross at the sea entrance to the marina marks the spot where James landed. Every September there is a grand fiesta to commemorate the landing with a mock battle between the Moors and Christians on the beach. It is a two-week fiesta which incorporates a pop concert and firework display.

Tourism 
The town is a popular holiday destination and attracts people from countries with colder climates such as Germany, the Netherlands, Ireland and the United Kingdom, especially from May to October. Some have bought villas and apartments in the hills on each side of the bay. In recent years, it has become a popular party destination among youths due to its great nightlife and its close distance to Magaluf, another party area.

Facilities 
Santa Ponsa has two 18-hole (I, II) and one 9-hole golf courses (III). Santa Ponsa II has hosted a PGA European Tour event and is open only to club members. Its 18th green is in the shape of the island of Majorca within a pond, reached by a bridge.

The Baleares International College, an English school founded in 1956, is located on the road to the nearby village of Magaluf.

Santa Ponsa also has a private marina, Club Náutico Santa Ponsa (Santa Ponsa Yacht Club), built in 1975 within the natural cove known as "Sa Caleta".  The marina can accommodate up to 522 boats from 7m to 20m in length as well as offering dry dock services.

Santa Ponsa hosts the Balearic Islands node of the COMETA electric power transmission system from the Spanish mainland.

Santa Ponsa is a well known holiday location for people of all ages, However, it is especially well recognised to be a holiday location for teens of the age 17 and up and was listed as the top ten holiday spot for older teens.

References

External links 
Santa Ponsa tourist information
Santa Ponsa tourist information UK
Santa Ponsa - Mallorca
Video "Santa Ponsa: Beaches & Golf" in Mallorca TV Teleweb+
Santa Ponsa - Majorca

Populated places in Calvià
Seaside resorts in Spain